Du Qiuniang or Lady Du Qiu (fl. AD 807–831) was a Tang dynasty Chinese poet. She is the only female poet to be included in the famous anthology Three Hundred Tang Poems.

Life
Born in Jinling (modern Nanjing), she became a concubine of the military governor Li Qi at fifteen. After Li was executed for rebelling against Emperor Xianzong, Du served in the emperor's palace. She was favourite of Xianzong, and Emperor Muzong appointed her governess of his sixth son Li Cou. After Li was falsely accused by Zheng Zhu and demoted, Du returned to Jinling.

Golden Dress Song 
Her only surviving poem is the Golden Dress Song, said to have been addressed to Li (translation by Victor Mair):
I urge you, milord, not to cherish your robe of golden thread,
Rather, milord, I urge you to cherish the time of your youth; 
When the flower is open and pluckable, you simply must pluck it, 
Don't wait till there are no flowers, vainly to break branches.

The "robe of golden thread" is a synecdoche for Li Qi's official career.

The Golden Dress Song, counseling the listener to enjoy the fleeting pleasures of youth, has been compared to Robert Herrick's To the Virgins, to Make Much of Time.

Legacy 

When she was living, poor and old, in her hometown, the poet Du Mu met her and wrote a poem about her. This poem is prefaced by a brief biography of Du, which is the source for the information we have about her life. 

There is a character in Tang Xianzu's play The Purple Flute of the same name, which has been taken as a reference to her.

References

External links

 Text of 金縷衣 in Chinese at Wikisource
 Text of 杜秋娘诗 in Chinese at Wikisource

Chinese women poets
Three Hundred Tang Poems poets
9th-century Chinese poets
Writers from Nanjing
Poets from Jiangsu
Tang dynasty imperial consorts